Sunset Trail is a 1939 American Western film directed by Lesley Selander, written by Norman Houston, and starring William Boyd, George "Gabby" Hayes, Russell Hayden, Charlotte Wynters, Jan Clayton, Robert Fiske and Kenneth Harlan. It was released on February 24, 1939, by Paramount Pictures.

Plot

Widow Ann Marsh (Charlotte Wynters), and her daughter Dorrie (Jan Clayton) return to Silver City and open a dude ranch after husband is killed and his $30,000 is missing.

Cast 
 William Boyd as Hopalong Cassidy
 George "Gabby" Hayes as Windy Halliday 
 Russell Hayden as Lucky Jenkins
 Charlotte Wynters as Ann Marsh
 Jan Clayton as Dorrie Marsh 
 Robert Fiske as Monte Keller
 Kenneth Harlan as John Marsh
 Anthony Nace as Henchman Steve Dorman
 Kathryn Sheldon as Abigail Snodgrass
 Maurice Cass as E. Prescott Furbush 
 Alphonse Ethier as Superintendent
 Glenn Strange as Bouncer
 Claudia Smith as Mary Rogers

References

External links 
 
 
 
 

1939 films
American black-and-white films
1930s English-language films
Films directed by Lesley Selander
Paramount Pictures films
American Western (genre) films
1939 Western (genre) films
Hopalong Cassidy films
1930s American films